Asperula crassula is a species of flowering plant in the family Rubiaceae, endemic to a few hundred hectares in northeast Crete. It was first described in 1857.

Description
Asperula crassula is perennial, short, and cushion-shaped. Its stems are worm-shaped and are often 2-4 mm long. Its flowers are short, dense, sub-cylindrical, medially bipartite, and about 1.5 mm long. It occurs on rocky slopes and flats of limestone and sandstone.

References

crassula
Flora of Greece